Colorado's 1st State Senate district is one of 35 districts in the Colorado Senate. It has been represented by Republican Byron Pelton since 2023. Prior to redistricting the district was represented by Republicans Jerry Sonnenberg and Greg Brophy.

Geography
District 1 covers much of the Eastern Plains in the state's northeastern corner, including all of Cheyenne, Elbert, Kit Carson, Lincoln, Logan, Morgan, Phillips, Sedgwick, Washington, and Yuma Counties and parts of Weld County. Communities in the district include Julesburg, Holyoke, Sterling, Brush, Fort Morgan, Eaton, Kersey, Lochbuie, Hudson, Keenesburg, Ault, Akron, Wray, Yuma, Burlington, Limon, Elizabeth, Ponderosa Park, and Cheyenne Wells.

The district is located entirely within Colorado's 4th congressional district, and overlaps with the 48th, 63rd, 64th, and 65th districts of the Colorado House of Representatives. It borders the states of Wyoming, Nebraska, and Kansas.

Recent election results

2022
Colorado state senators are elected to staggered four-year terms; under normal circumstances, the 1st district holds elections in midterm years. The 2022 election is the first held under the state's new district lines.

Historical election results

2018

2014

Federal and statewide results in District 1

Past senators

References 

1
Cheyenne County, Colorado
Elbert County, Colorado
Kit Carson County, Colorado
Lincoln County, Colorado
Logan County, Colorado
Morgan County, Colorado
Phillips County, Colorado
Sedgwick County, Colorado
Washington County, Colorado
Weld County, Colorado
Yuma County, Colorado